Hotel Motithang is a hotel in Thimphu, Bhutan. It was established in 1974 on the occasion of the coronation of Jigme Singye Wangchuck. At the time, the hotel was located in the middle of forest, separated from the city by farmland but today this area has grown up with houses and gardens. It has 14 rooms and a restaurant which serves up to 30 people, serving Bhutanese. Indian and continental cuisine.

References

Hotels in Thimphu
Hotels established in 1974
Hotel Motithang